The 2008–09 Bangladesh women's Tri-Nation series was a cricket tournament that was held from 6 to 17 February 2009 in Bangladesh. It was a tri-nation series featuring Bangladesh women, Pakistan women and Sri Lanka women, with the second, third and the final matches played as Women's One Day Internationals (WODIs). As Bangladesh women had not received ODI status when the tournament was being held, the matches involving Bangladesh women were not played with WODI status.

The WODI fixtures were originally the part of Pakistan and Sri Lanka's preparation for the 2009 Women's Cricket World Cup. Grameenphone, the country's leading mobile phone operator, earned the right to sponsor the women's tri-nation series.

The hosts started their campaign disappointingly as they lost the inaugural match of the series by 7 wickets against Pakistan women. Sri Lanka women were the first team to qualify for the final, after they beat Pakistan women by 115 runs and won their three consecutive matches in the tournament.

Bangladesh women won their only match of the tournament, on 13 February 2009 by 6 wickets, when they bowled out Sri Lanka women for just 67 runs, to keep the final hopes alive. However, in the following match, Pakistan women restricted Bangladesh to 94 runs in the first innings, and beat the hosts by 9 wickets to reach the final. Sri Lanka women won by 6 wickets in the final match against Pakistan, and was crowned as the champions of the tri-nation series.

Squads

Points table 

 advanced to the Final

Fixtures

1st Match

2nd Match

3rd Match

4th Match

5th Match

6th Match

Final

References

External links 

 Series home at ESPNcricinfo

Pakistan women's national cricket team tours
Sri Lanka women's national cricket team tours
Women's international cricket tours of Bangladesh
International cricket competitions in 2008–09
2009 in women's cricket
2009 in Pakistani women's sport